Bruce J. Winick was the Silvers-Rubenstein Distinguished Professor of Law and Professor of Psychiatry and Behavioral Sciences at the University of Miami in Coral Gables, Florida, where he had taught since 1974. He was an internationally known scholar and lecturer in mental health law and in law and psychology. The co-founder of the school of social enquiry known as therapeutic jurisprudence, Winick is Director of the University of Miami School of Law’s recently established Therapeutic Jurisprudence Center. Winick also had a long career as a civil rights lawyer, and had served as an expert witness on a variety of law-related issues.  Winick died in 2010 after a long battle with cancer.

Education
He was a 1968 graduate of the New York University School of Law and a 1965 graduate of Brooklyn College of the City University of New York.

Career
Winick recently served as the first Chair of the Association of American Law Schools’ Section on Balance in Legal Education. He has received numerous awards. In 2009, he received the Philippe Pinel Award of the International Academy of Law and Mental Health, the Academy’s highest honor. In 2007, he was named Honorary Distinguished Member of the American Psychology-Law Society. He also has received the University of Miami Provost’s Award for Outstanding Scholarship, the Thurgood Marshall Award of the Association of the Bar of the City of New York, and the Human Rights Award of the American Immigration Lawyers Association.

Professor Winick previously served as New York City’s Director of Court Mental Health Services and as General Counsel of its Department of Mental Health and has practiced law in New York City.

Writing
Winick has authored numerous books. These include Civil Commitment: A Therapeutic Jurisprudence Model (2005), Judging in a Therapeutic Key: Therapeutic Jurisprudence and the Courts (2003) (co-edited with David B. Wexler), Protecting Society from Sexually Dangerous Offenders: Law, Justice, and Therapy (2003) (co-edited with John Q. LaFond), Practicing Therapeutic Jurisprudence: Law as a Helping Profession (2000) (co-edited with Dennis P. Stolle and David B. Wexler), The Essentials of Florida Mental Health Law: A Straightforward Guide for Clinicians of All Disciplines (2000) (co-authored with Stephen H. Behnke and Alina M. Perez), The Right to Refuse Mental Health Treatment (1997), THERAPEUTIC JURISPRUDENCE APPLIED: ESSAYS ON MENTAL HEALTH LAW (1997), LAW IN A THERAPEUTIC KEY: DEVELOPMENTS IN THERAPEUTIC JURISPRUDENCE (1996) (co-edited with David B. Wexler), CONSENT TO VOLUNTARY HOSPITALIZATION (1993) (American Psychiatric Association Task Force Report No. 34) (co-edited with Francine Cournos et al.), ESSAYS IN THERAPEUTIC JURISPRUDENCE (1991) (co-authored with David B. Wexler), and Current Issues in Mental Disability Law,(1987) (co-edited with Alexander D. Brooks). He also has edited or co-edited 13 symposia issues of legal and interdisciplinary journals. In addition, he has authored more than 110 articles in law reviews and interdisciplinary journals.

Winick is co-editor of the American Psychological Association Books book series, Law, and Public Policy: Psychology and the Social Sciences. He is legal advisor and member of the board of editors of Psychology, Public Policy and Law, and serves on the editorial boards of Law & Human Behavior, Psychiatry, Psychology & Law, and the International Journal of Law and Psychiatry.

Personal life
Winick had four children: Margot, Graham, Amber and Brendan.

References

1944 births
2010 deaths
American civil rights lawyers
American legal writers
University of Miami faculty
Brooklyn College alumni
American male non-fiction writers
20th-century American lawyers
20th-century American non-fiction writers
20th-century American male writers
21st-century American lawyers
21st-century American non-fiction writers
21st-century American male writers